Daphne Eurydice Zuniga (born October 28, 1962) is an American actress. She made her film debut in the 1982 slasher film The Dorm That Dripped Blood (1982) at the age of 19, followed by a lead role in another slasher film The Initiation (1984) two years later.

She went on to star in several comedies, including Rob Reiner's The Sure Thing (1985), opposite John Cusack, and the cult comedies Modern Girls (1986), and Spaceballs (1987). She also starred opposite Lucille Ball in the television drama film Stone Pillow (1986), and in the science-fiction horror sequel The Fly II (1989). Zuniga  later gained major exposure as a television actress for her role as Jo Reynolds on the Fox primetime soap opera Melrose Place from 1992 to 1996. Other television credits include roles as Victoria Davis on One Tree Hill (2008–2012), and as Lynn Kerr on the drama series Beautiful People.

Zuniga has been active in environmental issues since the mid-2000s, and was a founding member of the Earth Communications Office. She has also worked with the Natural Resources Defense Council, the Waterkeeper Alliance, and Environment California.

Early life
Zuniga was born in San Francisco, California on October 28, 1962, to Agnes A. (née Janawicz) and Joaquín Alberto Zúñiga Mazariegos. Her mother is a Unitarian minister, of Polish and Finnish descent, and her father, originally from Guatemala, was an emeritus professor of philosophy at California State University, East Bay. Zuniga has a sister, Jennifer Zuniga. 

In her early teens, Zuniga expressed interest in acting, and attended the Young Conservatory program of the American Conservatory Theater  of San Francisco. After her parents divorced, Zuniga moved with her mother and sister from Berkeley, California, to Reading, Vermont, where she spent the remainder of her teen years. Zuniga graduated from Woodstock Union High School in Woodstock, Vermont, in 1980, after which she returned to California and enrolled at the University of California, Los Angeles to study theater arts. After leaving college, Zuniga was close friends and roommates with fellow actress Meg Ryan.

Career

Early work
Zuniga made her film debut in Stephen Carpenter's slasher film The Dorm That Dripped Blood (1982), playing a supporting role as a college student. Two years later, she made her lead debut in The Initiation, another college-themed slasher co-starring Vera Miles and Clu Gulager. "It was a great part," Zuniga recalled. "I got to play twins: a good sister and an evil sister. I got shot in the back on-screen. It was pretty heavy for a first role."

She then appeared in the drama Vision Quest (1985), followed by a lead role in Rob Reiner's The Sure Thing (1985), opposite John Cusack. The film was critically praised; critic Roger Ebert said of the film: "The movie industry seems better at teenage movies like Porky's, with its sleazy shower scenes, than with screenplays that involve any sort of thought about the love lives of its characters. That's why The Sure Thing is a small miracle." Shortly after, Zuniga was cast in the television drama film Stone Pillow (1985), playing a social worker in New York City who forms a bond with an elderly homeless woman, played by Lucille Ball. She also appeared in the comedy Modern Girls (1986), opposite Cynthia Gibb and Virginia Madsen.

In 1987, Zuniga was cast as Princess Vespa in Mel Brooks's cult comedy Spaceballs, opposite Rick Moranis, Bill Pullman, and John Candy. Though the film received mixed critical reception, it later garnered a cult following. The next year, Zuniga appeared in a lead role in the blockbuster horror film The Fly II (1988), followed by the drama-comedy Staying Together (1989), and as a med student opposite Matthew Modine in the drama Gross Anatomy (1989).

Melrose Place, film, and television
In 1992, she was cast as Jo Reynolds in the Fox soap opera Melrose Place, and appeared on the show as a recurring character until 1996. The role garnered Zuniga major exposure to television audiences, though her television career had begun in the early eighties with a minor role on Family Ties (1984) as a girlfriend of Alex P. Keaton. She also appeared in the 1995 miniseries Degree of Guilt.

In 1994, Zuniga appeared in the release of a video for Bob Seger's previously released 1976 hit "Night Moves". In the video version of the song, she and a pre-Friends Matt LeBlanc are shown in a 1960s drive-in theater, where Zuniga as a dark, edgy young woman becomes a visual fascination for LeBlanc as a clean-cut young man. In 2000, Zuniga appeared as a bartender in the music video for Evan and Jaron's single "Crazy for This Girl".

Later, Zuniga would work as a voice actor on the animated television series Stories from My Childhood (1998), and also had a lead role in the miniseries Pandora's Clock (1996), an action thriller filmed in Seattle, Washington.

From 2005 to 2006, she was cast as Lynn Kerr on the ABC family series Beautiful People, and also had a recurring role in the series American Dreams. She also appeared in a recurring role as Victoria Davis on The CW series One Tree Hill between 2008 and 2012, appearing in over forty episodes. During this time, she appears in several made-for-television movies including Secret Lives (2005), The Obsession (2006), Christmas Do-Over (2006), Mail Order Bride (2008), and On Strike for Christmas (2010).

In 2007, Zuniga co-produced and co-directed (with Steven Latham) the documentary "The Future We Will Create: Inside the World of TED" — a look at the annual Technology, Entertainment and Design conference held in Monterey, California. She also starred in the scripted web series Novel Adventures, which premiered November 3, 2008 from CBS Interactive. In February and March 2008, Zuniga appeared onstage in a production of The Scene by Theresa Rebeck, at the San Francisco Playhouse.

Zuniga reprised her role as Princess Vespa from the 1987 film Spaceballs, by voice-over in the television spin-off Spaceballs: The Animated Series. She also reprised her role from Melrose Place in an updated version, but it was short-lived, as the series was cancelled after just one season in 2009–10. She starred in 2010 in the hit Hallmark Channel film A Family Thanksgiving. In 2013, Zuniga appeared as a postal worker in the Hallmark Channel series Signed, Sealed, Delivered, as well as the television film based on the series and in Gone Missing with Lauren Bowles.

Zuniga appeared in a guest starring role in the VH1 scripted series Hindsight as Libby. In 2016, she was cast in a new TV movie for Hallmark Channel, When Duty Calls, with Judd Nelson and Daniella Monet.

More recently, Daphne Zuniga starred in Heartbeats, Witness Unprotected and A Christmas Arrangement with Miles Fisher.

In 2018, Zuniga directed her first feature film, The Protégé, with Keenan Tracey and Jeannette Sousa. It was released in 2019 under the title Deadly Assistant.

In 2019, she co-starred in the television film Gates Of Paradise, opposite Lizzie Boys and Jason Priestley, and Christmas In Paris with Karl E. Ländler.

In 2020, she was a guest star in NCIS as Stacy Gordon, Navy commander.

In 2021, she was a guest star in Fantasy Island as Margot, with her old Melrose Place co-stars Josie Bissett and Laura Leighton.

In 2022, Zuniga appeared on Dynasty as Sonya Jackson.

Environmental activism
Zuniga has cited her family's camping trips to Yosemite National Park and Yellowstone as sparking her lifelong interest in the environment. "The planet does nothing but support us," she said in a 2007 interview, "and we are constantly committing crimes against nature."

Zuniga has supported several environmental campaigns. In 2009, she was appointed by Los Angeles Mayor Antonio Villaraigosa to the Board of Directors of the Los Angeles River Revitalization Corporation, a not-for-profit development corporation charged with catalyzing sustainable development along the Los Angeles River.

Zuniga was a founding member of the Earth Communications Office (ECO), and has worked with the Natural Resources Defense Council, the Waterkeeper Alliance, and Environment California.

Personal life
Zuniga's younger sister Jennifer, also an actress, debuted in the film A Woman, Her Men, and Her Futon (1992). Zuniga attends private Buddhist meditation retreats to manage stress in her life.

In 2004, Zuniga suffered from mercury poisoning, which she attributed to overconsumption of fish. She said she had eaten sushi four times in the week prior to being taken to the emergency room and that her symptoms included weak memory, headaches, crying spells, skin rashes, and mild depression. After her diagnosis, Zuniga stopped consuming fish in addition to other meat.

Zuniga began dating businessman David Mleczko, whom she met on a blind date, in 2006. The two married in a private ceremony in Cambridge, Massachusetts, on June 8, 2019.

Filmography

Film

Television

References

External links

 
 
 

20th-century American actresses
21st-century American actresses
Activists from California
Actresses from Berkeley, California
Actresses from San Francisco
American Buddhists
American environmentalists
American film actresses
American people of Finnish descent
American people of Guatemalan descent
American people of Polish descent
American television actresses
American women environmentalists
Berkeley High School (Berkeley, California) alumni
Hispanic and Latino American actresses
Living people
University of California, Los Angeles alumni
UCLA Film School alumni
1962 births